Bolton Equities Black Spoke is a New Zealand UCI Continental cycling team focusing on road bicycle racing. The team is run by ex-professional Scott Guyton.

History

Formation
The team was established in 2020 with the involvement of Australian commentator and former cyclist David McKenzie and high-performance coach Marc Prutton.

Backing was provided by businessman Murray Bolton along with other sponsors, institutional supporters and suppliers such as the Armstrong Motor Group, Cycling New Zealand, Giordana, Lazer, Pinarello and Shimano. Other sponsors and equipment suppliers have included Kiwivelo, Park Tool, Pirelli, Pro Bikegear, and Thule Group. In 2022 Bolton Equities run by Murray Bolton stepped up to be the naming sponsor of the team.

2022
The 2022 season started with the New Zealand Cycle Classic where the team took Stage 1 of the race putting Regan Gough into yellow. Stage 2 of the race only Mark Stewart was able to keep up with the front bunch and sprinted to second on the stage moving him into yellow. Stage 3 was a mass sprint with Stewart home safely in yellow and Mitchel Fitzsimons sprinting to seventh. The Queen stage of the Tour was Stage 4 finishing up Te Wharau Hill, Stewart took the stage attacking away from UCI WorldTour Professional George Bennett New Zealand National team and Ollie Jones. The final stage was a short lap race around the main streets of Wellington Regan Gough attacked with a few kilometers to go and managed to hold off the other riders to win ahead of the sprinters. The team won the overall and Mountain classification with Mark Stewart plus 3 stages.

Next on the calendar for the team was the New Zealand National Time Trial and Road Race Championships. The time trial was held first with Regan Gough winning the elite competition and Logan Currie the Under-23. Being the largest New Zealand UCI cycling team they were the favorites to win the road race. The road race was cut short due to strong winds from Cyclone Dovi and at the time James Fouché was in a break alone and so he was deemed the winner. The Oceania Road Cycling Championships were held in Australia and while riding for New Zealand Currie won the Under-23 Time trial with Fouché winning the elite road race and Gate the elite Time trial.

With the home races done the team headed abroad to start their European season. The first European race for the team was Tour du Loir-et-Cher where the team managed a podium in stage 2 with Aaron Gate and Luke Mudgway finishing in fourteenth overall. Then off to the Arno Wallaard Memorial where Tom Sexton missed the move of the day and finished in fourteenth 1:30 down on the winner. The final race for April was the 2022 International Tour of Hellas, a five stage race in Greece. In stage 1 Gate managed to get into the breakaway with Fouche there to help pull the breakaway where Gate managed to stay away solo and win the stage by 1:46 to Eduard Prades who mistakenly celebrated thinking he had won. Gate held the jersey through all the following stages with hard work from the team to take home the turquoise leaders jersey as the Overall winner Stewart finished third overall 1:56 down on Gate. This was the teams first Overall victory outside of Oceania.

May started with the Ronde van Overijssel where Mudgway finished eleventh in the bunch sprint. Then on to the Arnhem–Veenendaal Classic where the top rider was Mudgway who finished twentieth. The team was unlucky in the Antwerp Port Epic with none of their riders making the front group, Ryan Christensen was first home nearly nine minutes down on winner Florian Vermeersch. The team the headed to Circuit de Wallonie a race for sprinters, once again missing out on a top ten finish Gate finished eleventh. Gate kept up with the front bunch at the Grote Prijs Marcel Kint finishing in twenty-fourth. The Tour de la Mirabelle was the next stage race for the team. It started with a short 2.6 km prologue where Currie placed best in twelfth six seconds down. The first road stage ended in a mass sprint with everyone keeping up but no one placing. Stage three was a hilly stage with a flat ending, Currie and James Oram were able to keep up to contest the reduced bunch sprint. They didn't place in the top ten however, because they kept up they moved into fourth and sixth overall respectively with Currie moving into the white jersey of the young rider classification. The final stage was hilly with 48 riders making it to the finish together Ethan Batt placed fifth in the sprint with Oram and Currie finishing on the same time securing their places in the GC and the youth jersey.

The Ronde de l'Oise came back after two years of cancellation due to COVID-19. The team set their sights on overall victory. Stage one started with Fouché getting into the breakaway of the day then being one of two riders left. He then attacked and gained an advantage over break-away companion Aritz Bagües of 44 seconds to win the opening stage solo. Gate sprinted to third on the stage 1:19 down on Fouché. Stages 2 and 3 ended in bunch sprints with both Fouché and Gate keeping up to retain first and third overall going into the final stage. The final stage was the flattest stage of the race with all riders except Sexton keeping up for the bunch sprint, unluckily for Gate Jason Tesson won the final stage and gave Tesson enough time to move up to third overall pushing Gate down to fourth. Fouché kept his overall lead and took home the white leaders jersey. Remaining in France the team headed to the Tour d'Eure-et-Loir where Ryan Christensen was the designated sprinter, sprinting to ninth, eleventh and third in the three-stage race claiming fifth overall. It was then off to the first UCI ProSeries race for the team the Tour of Belgium. Stage 1 of the race started with Gate trying to  get into the break of the day but getting caught a few kilometers later. Luke Mudgway managed to get into the break though, with 70 km to go he attacked but was caught by the break with 68 km to go. With 2 laps to go the race was back together a high-speed punchy finish combined with a puncture for Christensen meant the Gate was best finisher in 30th place.

In December 2022, Union Cycliste Internationale announced that Bolton Equities Black Spoke Pro Cycling was granted a UCI ProTeam licence for 2023 season.

2023

The team now a UCI ProTeam changed their name to Bolton Equities Black Spoke.

Team roster

Major wins

2020
 Stage 1 New Zealand Cycle Classic, Aaron Gate
 Gravel and Tar, Hayden McCormick
2021
 New Zealand Cycle Classic
Stage 2, Luke Mudgway
Stage 5, Campbell Stewart
 Gravel and Tar, Aaron Gate
  National Time Trial Championships, Aaron Gate
 Stages 2 & 3 A Travers les Hauts de France, Campbell Stewart
2022
  Overall New Zealand Cycle Classic, Mark Stewart
Stage 1 (TTT) 
Stage 4, Mark Stewart
Stage 5, Regan Gough
  National Time Trial Championships, Regan Gough
  National U23 Time Trial Championships, Logan Currie
  National Road Race Championships, James Fouché
  Overall International Tour of Hellas, Aaron Gate
Stage 1, Aaron Gate
  Ronde de l'Oise, James Fouché
Stage 1, James Fouché
  Overall Grand Prix Cycliste de Gemenc, Luke Mudgway
  Overall Tour of Romania, Mark Stewart
Prologue, Tom Sexton
 Stage 3 Tour de Luxembourg, Aaron Gate
2023
  Overall New Zealand Cycle Classic, James Oram
Stage 1, James Oram 
Stage 3, Josh Burnett
Stage 4, Luke Mudgway
  National Criterium Championships, Luke Mudgway
  National Time Trial Championships, Aaron Gate
  National U23 Time Trial Championships, Logan Currie
  National Road Race Championships, James Oram

National champions
2021
  New Zealand Time Trial, Aaron Gate
2022
  New Zealand Time Trial, Regan Gough
  New Zealand Under-23 Time Trial, Logan Currie
  New Zealand Road Race, James Fouché
2023
  New Zealand Criterium, Luke Mudgway
  New Zealand Time Trial, Aaron Gate
  New Zealand Under-23 Time Trial, Logan Currie
  New Zealand Road Race, James Oram
  New Zealand Under-23 Road Race, Logan Currie

Notes

References

External links

Cycling teams based in New Zealand
Cycling teams established in 2020
2020 establishments in New Zealand
UCI Continental Teams (Oceania)